Modernity Killed Every Night is the debut studio album by The Wolfmen, released in the United Kingdom on 1 September 2008.

Reception
Modernity Killed Every Night has garnered glowing reviews from music critics. One example being the musicOMH review, which hailed the debut as "a warm, energetic and superbly crafted album from a band that knows exactly how to make it all sound wonderfully effortless." Insound stated that the album is "a delicious collision of glam rock and punk rock".

Track listing
 Needle in the Camel's Eye	
 Jackie Says	
 Cecilie	
 While London Sleeps	
 Love Is A Dog	
 Up All Nighter	
 Better Days	
 Wak This Bass	
 Buzz Me Kate	
 If You Talk Like That	
 Je T'aime Madame

References

2008 debut albums
The Wolfmen albums